Simon Chapman may refer to:

 Simon Chapman (academic) (born 1951), Australian academic and anti-smoking activist
 Simon Chapman (author) (born 1965), British children's author